Zoé Whitley (born 30 December 1979) is an American art historian and curator who has been director of Chisenhale Gallery since 2020. Based in London, she has held curatorial positions at the Victoria and Albert Museum, the Tate galleries, and the Hayward Gallery. At the Tate galleries, Whitley co-curated the 2017 exhibition Soul of a Nation: Art in the Age of Black Power, which was described by ARTnews as one of the most important art exhibitions of the 2010s. Soon after she was chosen to organise the British pavilion at the 2019 Venice Biennale.

Whitley's research interests include contemporary artists and art practices from Africa and the African diaspora.

Early life and education 
Zoé Whitley was born on 30 December 1979 in Washington, D.C. Her family moved to Los Angeles, California, when she was a teenager. In high school, she took classes on art history and studio art. She recalled taking a trip to the Getty Villa after her parents could not afford to send her on a school trip to Europe.

Whitley attended Swarthmore College in Pennsylvania, where she studied art history and French. For her first assignment on contemporary art, Whitley recounted basing her essay on the thoughts that a black security guard working at the Philadelphia Museum of Art gave her about Nigredo (1984), a painting by Anselm Kiefer: "Everything that ended up in my essay, which my art-history professor said was really excellent, came from what he was able to share with me."

While attending Swarthmore, in 1999, Whitley completed an internship at the costume and textiles department of the Los Angeles County Museum of Art. There, department head Sharon Takeda and her colleague, Kaye Spilker, recommended Whitley become a curator. On their advice, Whitley studied at the Royal College of Art in London, where she earned a master's degree in design history. Her master's thesis examined black representation in Vogue magazine. She later earned a PhD from the University of Central Lancashire, where her work was supervised by British artist and curator Lubaina Himid.

Career 
Whitley started her career at the Victoria and Albert Museum in London in 2003. For two years, Whitley worked as an assistant curator in the museum's prints section. She then became a curator in 2005. In 2007, she organised Uncomfortable Truths, an exhibition that commemorated the bicentenary of the abolition of the British slave trade. The exhibition examined traces of the slave trade in contemporary art and design. In 2013, she stepped down from her position to begin a PhD at the University of Central Lancashire. As an independent curator, she co-curated the Afrofuturism-focused exhibition The Shadows Took Shape at the Studio Museum in Harlem.

In 2013, Whitley joined the Tate galleries. Between 2013 and 2015, she held dual curatorial positions at Tate Britain and Tate Modern as curator in international art and curator of contemporary British art, respectively. After April 2017, the focus of her work became international art and the collection of Tate Modern. With Mark Godfrey, she co-curated the 2017 exhibition Soul of a Nation: Art in the Age of Black Power, which examined the response of more than sixty artists in America to the Civil Rights Movement and the subsequent Black Power movement. The exhibition, according to Whitley, emphasised "art and artists, rather than a social history of art and ephemera," and includes works by Frank Bowling, Betye Saar, and Barkley L. Hendricks. ARTnews described Soul of a Nation as one of the most important art exhibitions of the 2010s. The Association of Art Museum Curators recognised Whitley in 2020 for the exhibition.

In 2019, Whitley became senior curator of the Hayward Gallery. She was curator of the British pavilion at the 58th Venice Biennale later that year, which featured an exhibition of sculptural installations, paintings, and prints by Cathy Wilkes. Whitley is the first African American curator to organise a national pavilion at the Venice Biennale. Her first and last exhibition at the Hayward was Reverb: Sound into Art, an exhibition that featured sound art by Christine Sun Kim, Kahlil Joseph, and Oliver Beer.

In 2020, Whitley was appointed director of Chisenhale Gallery. With Nancy Ireson, Whitley co-curated Elijah Pierces America, a retrospective of the works of American woodcarver Elijah Pierce exhibited at the Barnes Foundation. Later that year, she oversaw Possessions, a section of the virtual "Frieze Viewing Room" that focuses on spirituality in contemporary art. In 2021, she was appointed to the Commission for Diversity in the Public Realm, a committee overseeing diversity in London's public monuments and its street and building names.

Personal life 
Whitley moved to London in the early 2000s.

See also 
 Women in the art history field

References 

1979 births
Living people
Directors of museums in the United Kingdom
Women museum directors
African-American curators
African-American women academics
American women academics
African-American academics
African-American historians
American women curators
American curators
American art historians
Women art historians
Historians of African art
People associated with the Tate galleries
People associated with the Victoria and Albert Museum
People from Washington, D.C.
People from Los Angeles
American expatriates in the United Kingdom
Swarthmore College alumni
Alumni of the Royal College of Art
Alumni of the University of Central Lancashire
Historians from California
21st-century African-American people
20th-century African-American people
20th-century African-American women
21st-century African-American women